is a train station on the Kagoshima Main Line operated by JR Kyushu in Ōnojō, Fukuoka prefecture, Japan.

Lines 

Layout 
The station consists of two opposed side platforms serving two tracks at grade.

Platforms

Environs 
Kyushu University Chikushi Campus
Shirakibaru Station (Nishitetsu Tenjin Ōmuta Line)
Dazaifu Mizuki-ato
Kasuga Park

Adjacent stations 

|-
|colspan=5 style="text-align:center;" |Kyūshū Railway Company

History
On 10 June 1946, Japanese Government Railways (JGR) opened the Kasuga Signal Box at the present location of the station. On 1 October 1961, Japanese National Railways (JNR), the successor of JGR, upgraded the facility to a full station and renamed it . With the privatization of JNR on 1 April 1987, JR Kyushu took over control of the station. On 11 March 1989, the station was renamed Ōnojō.

Passenger statistics
In fiscal 2016, the station was used by an average of 8,138 passengers daily (boarding passengers only), and it ranked 19th among the busiest stations of JR Kyushu.

References

External links
Ōnojō Station (JR Kyushu)

Railway stations in Fukuoka Prefecture
Railway stations in Japan opened in 1961